Coldd Lassi Aur Chicken Masala (Cold Buttermilk and Chicken Masala) is an Indian romantic comedy web series starring Divyanka Tripathi Dahiya and Rajeev Khandelwal. Produced by Doris Dey & Suhail Zaidi it is directed by Pradeep Sarkar. The filming of the series began in February 2019 in Vadodara. The story revolves around two hotel management students, Nitya and Vikram who later become chefs. It marks the debut of Tripathi in the digital medium. The series premiered and started streaming on 3 September 2019 on ALT Balaji It is also available on ZEE5.

Plot
Fate brings ex-lovers Nithya, Indie Spice's head chef, and Vikram, a Michelin Star chef, together after 8 yrs. Memories of the lost love return along with the bitterness of the past.

Vikram comes back to Nithya's life after 8 years. They have a child together Vivaan. Revati and Nithya's restaurant is not doing well, and Vikram and Manira have bought shares in the restaurant. The present story has constant flashbacks of the past.

Cast

Main
 Divyanka Tripathi Dahiya as Chef Nitya Sharma– Head Chef; Vikram's former wife; Vivaan's mother
 Rajeev Khandelwal as Chef Vikram Singh Chauhan– Nitya's former husband; Vivaan's father

Recurring
 Priyanshu Chatterjee as Dr. Karan Kapadia - Psychiatrist; Nitya's friend
 Barkha Bisht as Seema - Nithya's older cousin sister, Vikram's one nightstand
 Navneet Nishan as Shaila
 Manini Mishra as Revati - Restaurant owner
 Vidhaan Sharma as Vivaan Singh Chauhan- Nithya and Vikram's son
 Rajveer Dey as Junaid
 Jaswinder Gardener as Mrinalini
 Madhu Sneha as Tanvi - Nitya's friend
 Mrinal Dutt as Kayzad Sonawala - Vikram's friend
 Worshipp Khanna as Chef Deven
 Errol Marks as Shekhar - Vikram's Sister's Husband (ex)
 Saloni Khanna as Manira - Vikram's Business partner
 Srishti Wadhwani as Shushma
 Serena Walia as Gauri Singh Chauhan - Vikram's Sister
 Riva Arora as Tara Kapadia - Karan's Daughter
 Munawar Faruqui as Roast Comic

Episodes

References

External links
 
 Coldd Lassi Aur Chicken Masala on ALTBalaji
 Coldd Lassi Aur Chicken Masala on ZEE5

ALTBalaji original programming
Hindi-language web series
ZEE5 original programming
Indian television shows
Indian web series
Zee TV original programming
Hindi-language television shows
Indian drama television series
2019 web series debuts